Markus Wagner (born 12 June 1964) is a German politician from the Alternative for Germany party. He has been leader of his group in the Landtag of North Rhine-Westphalia since 2017.

Personal life 
He and his wife have an adopted son from Haiti.

References 

Living people
1964 births
Members of the Landtag of North Rhine-Westphalia
21st-century German politicians
Alternative for Germany politicians
Landtag group leaders (North Rhine-Westphalia)